Filomeno Mata Totonac is a Totonac language spoken in Filomeno Mata, Veracruz, Mexico.

Phonology

Consonants

 // is only found in Spanish loanwords
 //, //, and // are only found in very recent Spanish loanwords

Vowels

 // and // are only found in loanwords from Spanish and other indigenous languages

References

Totonacan languages